Gérard Coinçon (born 18 March 1939) is a French footballer. He competed in the men's tournament at the 1960 Summer Olympics.

References

External links
 
 

1939 births
Living people
French footballers
Olympic footballers of France
Footballers at the 1960 Summer Olympics
Sportspeople from Belfort
Association football forwards
AS Saint-Étienne players
RC Strasbourg Alsace players
FC Grenchen players
FC Lugano players
Racing Besançon players
French expatriate footballers
Expatriate footballers in Switzerland
French expatriate sportspeople in Switzerland
Footballers from Bourgogne-Franche-Comté